In Greek mythology, the Meliae  (also called Meliads) (or) were usually considered to be the nymphs of the ash tree, whose name they shared.

Mythology
According to Hesiod, the Meliae (probably meaning all tree-nymphs) were born from the drops of blood that fell on Gaia [Earth] when Cronus castrated Uranus. In Hesiod's Works and Days, the ash trees, perhaps meaning the Melian nymphs, are said to have been the progenitors of the generation of men belonging to Hesiod's Bronze Age.

The Meliae were nurses of the infant Zeus in the Cretan Dikti mountains, according to the 3rd century BC poet Callimachus, Hymn to Zeus, where they fed him on the milk of the goat Amalthea and honey.

Callimachus appears to make the Theban nymph Melia, who was, by Apollo, the mother of Tenerus and  Ismenus, one of the "earth-born" Meliae. Elsewhere, however, this Melia is an Oceanid, one of the many daughters of Oceanus and Tethys.

Notes

References
 Apollonius of Rhodes, Apollonius Rhodius: the Argonautica, translated by Robert Cooper Seaton, W. Heinemann, 1912. Internet Archive.
 Burkert, Walter, 1985. Greek Religion (Cambridge: Harvard University Press).
 Caldwell, Richard, Hesiod's Theogony, Focus Publishing/R. Pullins Company (June 1, 1987). .
 Hesiod, Theogony, in The Homeric Hymns and Homerica with an English Translation by Hugh G. Evelyn-White, Cambridge, Massachusetts., Harvard University Press; London, William Heinemann Ltd. 1914. Online version at the Perseus Digital Library.
 Hesiod; Works and Days, in The Homeric Hymns and Homerica with an English Translation by Hugh G. Evelyn-White, Cambridge, Massachusetts., Harvard University Press; London, William Heinemann Ltd. 1914. Online version at the Perseus Digital Library.
 Hard, Robin, The Routledge Handbook of Greek Mythology: Based on H.J. Rose's "Handbook of Greek Mythology", Psychology Press, 2004, .
 Larson, Jennifer, "Greek Nymphs : Myth, Cult, Lore", Oxford University Press (US). June 2001. 
 Most, G. W., Hesiod: Theogony, Works and Days, Testimonia, Loeb Classical Library, No. 57, Cambridge, Massachusetts, 2006 . Online version at Harvard University Press.
 Pausanias, Pausanias Description of Greece with an English Translation by W.H.S. Jones, Litt.D., and H.A. Ormerod, M.A., in 4 Volumes. Cambridge, Massachusetts, Harvard University Press; London, William Heinemann Ltd. 1918. Online version at the Perseus Digital Library.
 Pausanias, Pausanias Description of Greece with an English Translation by W.H.S. Jones, Litt.D., and H.A. Ormerod, M.A., in 4 Volumes. Cambridge, Massachusetts, Harvard University Press; London, William Heinemann Ltd. 1918. Online version at the Perseus Digital Library.
 Pindar, Nemean Odes. Isthmian Odes. Fragments, Edited and translated by William H. Race. Loeb Classical Library No. 485. Cambridge, Massachusetts: Harvard University Press, 1997. . Online version at Harvard University Press.
 West, M. L. (1966), Hesiod: Theogony, Oxford University Press. .

Dryads
Nymphs
Greek legendary creatures
Tree goddesses